The Jeannine Rainbolt College of Education is the education unit of the University of Oklahoma in Norman. As of fall 2005, the school had an enrollment of 639 undergraduates and 777 graduates. The building is also called Collings Hall.

The College of Education began in 1930 under then president William Bennett Bizzell. It was headed by its first dean, Dr. Ellsworth Collings. To this day, the College of Education main offices reside in Collings Hall. Dr. Gregg Garn is the current dean.

In October 2008 it was announced that the College of Education had received a $8 million gift from H.E. (Gene) Rainbolt in honor of his late wife, Jeannine Rainbolt. Because of that contribution, the OU Board of Regents unanimously voted to rename the college in Rainbolt's honor. It is the only college at OU to be named for a female.

Part of Rainbolt's gift, with other gifts and university funding, was used to pay for a $9.5 million renovation to Collings Hall. Construction, which concluded in summer of 2010, reconstructed the building's facade and add an additional 15,000 feet of classroom space. It was the building's first major building project since 1958.

The Jeannine Rainbolt College of Education was designated an Apple Distinguished Program for 2013–15. The Apple Distinguished Program designation is reserved for programs that meet criteria for innovation, leadership and educational excellence and demonstrate Apple's vision of exemplary learning environments. The college participates in a one-to-one iPad initiative, where students who are enrolled in the undergraduate teacher education program each receive an iPad at the beginning of their first semester in the college. Upon successful completion of the degree program the students keep the device and the digital content they created to use in their teaching careers.

Academic programs
Instructional Leadership & Academic Curriculum
Early Childhood Education
Elementary Education
English Education
Mathematics Education
Science Education
Social Studies Education
Reading Specialist
Instructional Leadership
Teacher Education
Educational Leadership & Policy Studies
Adult and Higher Education
Educational Administration, Curriculum, and Supervision
Studies
Educational Psychology
Instructional Psychology and Technology
Counseling Psychology
Special Education

External links
University of Oklahoma College of Education

Notes

Education, College of
Schools of education in Oklahoma
Educational institutions established in 1930
1930 establishments in Oklahoma